KZHK (95.9 FM) is a radio station broadcasting a classic rock format. Licensed to St. George, Utah, United States, the station is currently owned by Canyon Media.

History
The station went on the air as KVYS on 1992-08-21.  On 1997-01-20, the station changed its call sign to the current KZHK.

Translators
KZHK also broadcasts on the following translators:

References

External links

ZHK
Radio stations established in 1998
1998 establishments in Utah